Duke Xi of Qi (died 698 BC) was from 730 to 698 BC the thirteenth recorded ruler of the State of Qi during the Spring and Autumn period of ancient China.  His personal name was Lü Lufu (呂祿甫), ancestral name Jiang (姜), and Duke Xi was his posthumous title.

Reign
Duke Xi succeeded his father Duke Zhuang I of Qi, who died in 731 BC after a reign of 64 years, as ruler of Qi.  In 706 BC, Qi was attacked by the Northern Rong tribes (also called Mountain Rong). Duke Zhuang of the State of Zheng sent Crown Prince Hu (later Duke Zhao of Zheng) to help Qi repel the Northern Rong.

Succession
Duke Xi reigned for 33 years and died in 698 BC.  He was succeeded by his son, Duke Xiang of Qi, who would later be murdered by Duke Xi's nephew Wuzhi. Wuzhi himself was also killed soon afterward, and Duke Xi's younger son Xiaobai ascended the throne, posthumously known as Duke Huan of Qi. Qi grew strong under Duke Huan's rule and he became the first of the Five Hegemons of the Spring and Autumn period.

Family
Wives:
 Wey Ji, of the Ji clan of Wey, the mother of Prince Xiaobai

Concubines:
 Lady, of Lu, the mother of Prince Jiu

Sons:
 Prince Zhu'er (729–686 BC), ruled as Duke Xiang of Qi from 697–686 BC
 Prince Jiu (d. 685 BC)
 Prince Xiaobai (d. 643 BC), ruled as Duke Huan of Qi from 684–643 BC

Daughters:
 Xuan Jiang
 Married Duke Xuan of Wey (d. 700 BC), and had issue (Viscount Shou of Wey, Duke Hui of Wey)
 Married Count Zhao of Wey in 687 BC, and had issue (Viscount Qi of Wey, Duke Dai of Wey, Duke Wen of Wey, Song Huan (the wife of Duke Huan of Song and mother of Duke Xiang of Song), Xu Mu)
 Wen Jiang (733–673 BC)
 Married Duke Huan of Lu (731–694 BC) in 709 BC, and had issue (two sons including Duke Zhuang of Lu)

Ancestry

References

Year of birth unknown
Monarchs of Qi (state)
8th-century BC Chinese monarchs
7th-century BC Chinese monarchs
698 BC deaths